ITCS may refer to:

Incremental Train Control System, an implementation of positive train control
Information Technology Central Services, a Myanmar ISP
Institute for Theoretical Computer Science, at Tsinghua University in Beijing
Innovations in Theoretical Computer Science, an academic conference in theoretical computer science